Cora Belle Brewster (1859 – July 25, 1937) was an American physician, surgeon, medical writer, and editor. She worked as a gynecological surgeon and co-founded two medical journals with her sister, Flora Alzora Brewster, M.D.

Early life and education
Cora Belle Brewster was born in Almond, New York, September 6, 1859.

She was the third daughter of Ephraim J. Brewster (d. 1868) and Mary Burdick Brewster. Mary was of the English extraction called Seventh Day Baptists. On the paternal side of her family, she is descended from the Campbells of Scotland, hence a mixture of English and Scotch heritage. She was a lineal descendant of Elder William Brewster, chief of the Pilgrim Fathers. Her ancestors did much in the establishment and toward the preservation of the free institutions of the U.S. Her lineage was traceable into English history before the landing of the Pilgrim Fathers.

Her siblings included sisters, Alice Delphine Brewster (b. 1861), Fidelia Adeline Brewster (b. 1865), Flora Alzora Brewster, M.D., as well as brothers, Luther Palmer Brewster (b. 1858) and Leonard Thorpe Brewster (b. 1868).

While in preparatory school, she was known by her middle name, "Belle". She was educated partly in Alfred University where she studied five years.

Early careers and medical school
She left school to take a position as teacher, and her work in the schoolroom covered several years. Her last work as a teacher was done in the high school in Smethport, Pennsylvania. In 1877, she went to Chicago and took a special course in the Northwestern University. While studying in that institution, she decided to abandon pedagogy, and on leaving the school, she took a position as purchasing agent for a large millinery establishment in Chicago.

The climate of Chicago proved too severe for her, and after three years of active service in that city she moved to Baltimore, Maryland. There ,her health was restored, and she began the study of medicine. She was graduated from the College of Physicians and Surgeons (Boston, Massachusetts) in May, 1886. During her course of study she spent eighteen months in Bellevue Hospital in New York City, where she gained a great deal of valuable experience in treating the thousands of cases of every sort that were to be found in that institution. She then went to Paris, France and finished her studies.

Baltimore

On her return from Europe, in 1886, she located in Baltimore, and began the practice of her profession in the treatment of female diseases, establishing a sanatorium at 1027 Madison Avenue. It was completely fitted up with all that was required for a fully-equipped institution of this character, and included a corps of trained physicians and nurses. Surgical and electrical treatment was administered as well as medicated baths.

In Baltimore, in partnership with her sister, Dr. Flora A. Brewster, she began in 1889 the publication of The Baltimore Family Health Journal the name of which was in 1901 changed to The Homeopathic Advocate and Health Journal, and made a hospital journal with a corps of ten editors. The partnership between the sister physician was dissolved in 1892.

In 1890, Brewster was elected gynecological surgeon to the Homeopathic Hospital and Free Dispensary of Maryland, under the auspices of the Maryland Homeopathic Medical Society. She was a member of the District of Columbia and Maryland Clinical Societies, of the Maryland State Medical Society, and of the American Institute of Homeopathy.

Personal life
Brewster never married. In July 1898, she adopted an infant, Victor Hamilton, and changed his surname to Brewster.

Brewster was a member of the Brown Memorial Presbyterian Church.

She was involved in several personal lawsuits. In 1900, Flora Brewster alleged that her sister, Cora, opened Flora's letters without authority, but did not prosecute. In 1903, Christiana Burrlls sued Cora Brewster in the Superior Court to recover  damages for injuries allegedly sustained while engaged in carrying coal from Dr. Brewster's cellar. In 1905, Cora and Flora each had a servant arrested on charge of larceny. In 1906, Cora Brewster was charged with striking a child in her employ and fined .

Cora Belle Brewster died July 25, 1937, at Dover, New Jersey of chronic myocarditis.

Selected works
 Family Health Journal 
 Homeopathic Advocate and Health Journal

Notes

References

Attribution

External links
 
 Cora Belle Brewster, 1859–? at Medicine in Maryland, 1752-1920

1865 births
1937 deaths
People from Allegany County, New York
19th-century American physicians
20th-century American physicians
19th-century American women physicians
20th-century American women physicians
19th-century American non-fiction writers
19th-century American women writers
Alfred University alumni
American gynecologists
Medical journal editors
American medical writers
American magazine founders
Women founders
Wikipedia articles incorporating text from A Woman of the Century